Yves Allegro and Daniele Bracciali are the defending champions but Allegro chose not to participate that year.
Bracciali partnered up with Rubén Ramírez Hidalgo, and they won in the final 6–4, 7–5 against James Cerretani and Jeff Coetzee.

Seeds

Main draw

Draw

References
Main Draw

Aspria Tennis Cup - Doubles
Aspria Tennis Cup